Antxón Muneta Beldarrain (born 1 July 1986) is a Spanish professional footballer who plays for UD Logroñés mainly as a midfielder.

Football career
Born in Bilbao, Biscay, Muneta spent six of his first seven seasons in Segunda División B, representing Club Portugalete, Barakaldo CF, CA Osasuna B and CD Mirandés. In 2006–07 he competed in Tercera División, with Zalla UC.

In the 2011–12 campaign, Muneta scored four goals in 32 games to help Mirandés promote to Segunda División for the first time ever. He made his debut in the competition on 17 August 2012, playing the full 90 minutes in a 0–1 home loss against SD Huesca; on 15 September he scored his first league goal, in a 2–2 draw at Real Murcia.

Muneta was released by the Rojillos in the 2014 summer, and subsequently moved to CF Reus Deportiu in the third level. On 30 January 2015 he was loaned to fellow league team UD Logroñés, until June. He left the club in the summer 2018.

On 19 September 2018, Muneta signed with Mérida AD. Muneta played 32 games and scored five goals, before he left the club at the end of the year. Muneta remained without club until 3 February 2020, where he joined Gimnástica de Torrelavega on a deal for the rest of the season. In August 2020, Muneta injured his meniscus and ligament in the knee, which required a surgery.

References

External links

1986 births
Living people
Spanish footballers
Footballers from Bilbao
Association football midfielders
Segunda División players
Segunda División B players
Tercera División players
Zalla UC footballers
Barakaldo CF footballers
CA Osasuna B players
CD Mirandés footballers
CF Reus Deportiu players
UD Logroñés players
Club Portugalete players
Mérida AD players
Gimnástica de Torrelavega footballers